The 43rd Signal Regiment is an inactive signals regiment of the Italian Army. The unit was formed in 1957 as a battalion, which operated and maintained the army's telecommunication network in the Tuscany and Emilia-Romagna regions. In 1975 the battalion was named for the Abetone Pass and received its own flag. In 1993 the battalion entered the newly formed 43rd Signal Regiment, which was disbanded in 1998. After the regiment was disbanded the Battalion "Abetone" was transferred to the 3rd Signal Regiment, which operates and maintains the army's telecommunications network in central Italy and on the island of Sardinia.

History 
On 1 October 1957 the XLIII Signal Battalion was formed in Florence with the personnel and materiel of the existing 6th and 7th territorial signal companies. The battalion consisted of a command, a command and services platoon, and three signals companies. The battalion was assigned to the VII Territorial Military Command in Florence.

During the 1975 army reform the army disbanded the regimental level and newly independent battalions were granted for the first time their own flags. During the reform signal battalions were renamed for mountain passes. On 1 October 1975 the XLIII Signal Battalion was renamed to 43rd Signal Battalion "Abetone". The battalion consisted of a command, a command and services platoon, and three signal companies. The battalion was assigned to the Signal Command of the Tuscan-Emilian Military Region and operated and maintained the army's telecommunication network in the Emilia-Romagna and Tuscany regions, the Liguria province of La Spezia, and the two Marche provinces of Ancona and Pesaro-Urbino. On 12 November 1976 the battalion was granted a flag by decree 846 of the President of the Italian Republic Giovanni Leone.

On 1 January 1986 the battalion consisted of a command, command and services company, and the 1st and 2nd TLC infrastructure managing companies. On 1 April 1987 the battalion added the 3rd Field Support Company.

On 16 September 1993 the 43rd Signal Battalion "Abetone" lost its autonomy and the next day the battalion entered the newly formed 43rd Signal Regiment as Battalion "Abetone". On the same date the flag of the 43rd Signal Battalion "Abetone" was transferred from the battalion to the 43rd Signal Regiment.

On 8 September 1998 the 43rd Signal Regiment was disbanded and the next day the Battalion "Abetone" joined the 3rd Signal Regiment, while the flag of the 43rd Signal Regiment was transferred on 11 September to the Shrine of the Flags in the Vittoriano in Rome.

Current structure 
As of 2022 the Battalion "Abetone" consists of:

  Battalion "Abetone", in Florence
 Command and Logistic Support Company
 4th Area Support Signal Company
 5th C4 Support Signal Company

The Command and Logistic Support Company fields the following platoons: C3 Platoon, Transport and Materiel Platoon, Medical Platoon, and Commissariat Platoon.

References

Signal Regiments of Italy